The Optimist LP is the first full-length album release by Turin Brakes. Critically acclaimed by the UK music press, the album was released in 2001 and cemented the band's place in the UK "acoustic movement" (a term invented by the music press). "The Door" and "The Road" (previously released on The Door EP) were re-recorded for this album.

Championed by radio DJs such as Jo Whiley (BBC Radio 1), the band provided a respite from the pop groups that dominated radio airplay at the time.

The album was nominated for the Mercury Music Prize.

In late 2011, Turin Brakes embarked on a national tour performing the whole of the album in its entirety for its tenth anniversary and again in 2021 for its twentieth anniversary.

Critical reception

Q listed The Optimist LP as one of the best 50 albums of 2001.

Track listing
"Feeling Oblivion" – 3:52
"Underdog (Save Me)" – 3:35
"Emergency 72" – 4:05
"Future Boy" – 4:00
"The Door" – 3:52
"State of Things" – 3:33
"By TV Light" – 4:53
"Slack" – 3:16
"Starship" – 2:50
"The Road" – 5:33
"Mind Over Money" – 4:53
"The Optimist" – 7:43
 The song "The Optimist" ends at 3:25. After 2 minutes of silence, at 5:25 the hidden song "Three Days Old" begins.

Charts

Weekly charts

Year-end charts

References

2001 debut albums
Turin Brakes albums